While the California film industry is based in Los Angeles, over the years many films have shot in Northern California, looking for rural towns, forests, rivers and beaches that can double for New England and even Scotland. Hollywood has been filming in California's northern most 18 counties since at least 1916 and the region has played host to some of Hollywood's biggest films, including The Adventures of Robin Hood, Gone with the Wind, Star Wars: Return of the Jedi, E.T. The Extra-Terrestrial, and Stand by Me.

This list of films shot is organized first by county, and then chronologically by year. Some films may appear more than once if they were shot in more than one county.

Del Norte County

Siskiyou County

Modoc County

Humboldt County

Trinity County

Shasta County

Lassen County

Mendocino County

Lake County

Tehama County

Butte County

^two episodes: The Foundling and Snow White and the Seven Truckers Part 1

Colusa County

Glenn County
No known movies or scripted television shows have filmed in Glenn County.

Plumas County

Sutter County

Yuba County

Sierra County

Nevada County

The list of movies filmed in Nevada County's Truckee is too extensive for this page. Some of the movies include Cobb, The Gold Rush, and St. Elmo's Fire. A partial list has been compiled by the Truckee-Donner Historical Society on their website truckeehistory.org, The Union and IMDb.

References

External links
Film in America - Northern California Movies, a partial list of movies filmed in Northern California.
AFI Film Catalog, a catalogue of Hollywood films that include filming location information.
Humboldt-Del Norte Film Commission, includes a map of famous filming locations and filmography lists for both counties.
Chico Chamber of Commerce - Butte County’s Film History
Film Shasta - Film Credits
Mendocino County Film Commission - Filmography
Truckee-Donner Historical Society - Truckee Filmography
Film Tehama
UpState California Film Commission
Siskiyou County Film Commission

Northern California
California
Films
Films